Pirangoclytus sulphurosus is a species of beetle in the family Cerambycidae. It was described by Di Iorio in 2006.

References

Clytini
Beetles described in 2006